Mauna or Mouna may refer to:

 Mauna (moth), genus of moths in the family Geometridae
 Mauna (silence), silence in Hindu philosophy
 Mauna, Käbschütztal, village in Käbschütztal, Germany
 A Hawaiian word for mountain, used in the following Hawaiian volcano names:
 Mauna Loa, on Hawai'i
 Mauna Kea, on Hawai'i
 Mauna Ulu, cinder cone of Kīlauea, on Hawai'i
 Mauna Iki, cinder cone of Kīlauea, on Hawai'i
 Mauna Haleakalā, on Maui
 Mauna Hina, cinder cone of Haleakalā